Aliidiomarina maris is a bacterium from the genus of Aliidiomarina which has been isolated from sediments from the South China Sea.

References

Bacteria described in 2012
Alteromonadales